This is a list of protests in the Republic of Georgia:

1956 Georgian demonstrations
1978 Georgian demonstrations
April 9 tragedy (1989)
1989 Sukhumi riots
Rose Revolution (2003)
2007 Georgian demonstrations
Protests regarding 2008 South Ossetia war
2009 Georgian demonstrations
2011 Georgian protests
2012 Georgian protests
2013 Tbilisi anti-homophobia rally protests
2018 Georgian protests
2019 Georgian protests
2020–2021 Georgian political crisis
2021 Tbilisi Pride protests
2023 Georgian protests

 
Protests
Georgia
Protests
Protests